San Francisco Bay Oil Spill may refer to:
The 1971 San Francisco Bay oil spill, resulting from a collision of two Standard Oil tankers
The 2007 Cosco Busan oil spill